Gijs Naber (born 9 August 1980) is a Dutch actor. He appeared in more than thirty films since 1998.

Filmography

Awards
Golden Calf for Best Actor (2014) for Aanmodderfakker

References

External links 

1980 births
Living people
Dutch male film actors
Dutch male actors
21st-century Dutch male actors